The Stings of Conscience is the debut studio album by American metalcore band Unearth, released in 2001. The album was produced by Adam Dutkiewicz of Killswitch Engage.

Critical reception
Guitar World called the album "groundbreaking," writing that these "forefathers of metalcore" combined "melodic licks with aggressive riffing in a manner both striking and original."

Track listing

Personnel
Unearth
Trevor Phipps - vocals
Buz McGrath - guitar
Ken Susi - guitar
Chris "Rover" Rybicki - bass
Mike Rudberg - drums

Other credits
Cover Illustration by Samantha Hill
Recorded in Westfield, Massachusetts in September 2000

References

2001 debut albums
Unearth albums
Eulogy Recordings albums
Albums produced by Adam Dutkiewicz